Gerald Neil Steinberg (20 April 1945 – 19 August 2015) was a Labour Party politician in the United Kingdom.  He was Member of Parliament for the City of Durham from 1987 until his retirement at the 2005 general election.

Early life

The son of Jewish parents Harry and Esther Steinberg, Gerry Steinberg attended St Margaret's CE Primary School in Durham and then Whinney Hill Secondary Modern School and Johnston Grammar School (both schools now known as Durham Johnston Comprehensive School) on Crossgate Moor. He gained a Teachers Certificate at Sheffield College of Education (now a campus of Sheffield Hallam University) on Collegiate Crescent in Sheffield and later a Diploma of Education (DipEd) of Backward Children (Special Educational Needs) at Newcastle Polytechnic (now Northumbria University Coach Lane Campus).

He started teaching at Hexham Camp School in 1966, then moved to Elemore Hall in County Durham in 1969. From 1975-87 he was at Whitworth House Special School in Spennymoor where he became Head Teacher. He joined the Labour Party in 1969 and became election agent for Durham MP  Dr Mark Hughes in 1973. In May 1975 he was elected to Durham City Council. He was secretary of the Labour Group on the city council from 1981 to 1987 and Co-Leader of the Council from 1983–87.

Parliamentary career

In 1985 he was selected from a short list of six to be the Labour parliamentary candidate for Durham City, after Hughes had decided not to stand again. Steinberg was elected as the Member of Parliament in June 1987. He was a member of a number of Parliamentary Committees, including the Education & Skills Select Committee and the Public Accounts Committee.

Personal life
Steinberg was admitted as an Honorary Freeman of the City of Durham on 8 December 2005.

On 25 August 1969 Steinberg married Margaret Thornton, a teacher, and had two children, Harry and Lyanne. Gerry Steinberg died on 19 August 2015 after suffering from cancer.

References

External links
 Gerry Steinberg official website
 
 Royal accounting in February 2005
 Durham students in February 2004
 Durham Theatre in December 2003
 Durham students in October 2003
 Teachers' sick leave in February 2003

1945 births
2015 deaths
Labour Party (UK) MPs for English constituencies
Transport and General Workers' Union-sponsored MPs
UK MPs 1987–1992
UK MPs 1992–1997
UK MPs 1997–2001
UK MPs 2001–2005
Alumni of Northumbria University
Councillors in County Durham
Schoolteachers from County Durham
People from Durham, England
Alumni of Sheffield Hallam University
Place of death missing
Jewish British politicians
Members of the Parliament of the United Kingdom for City of Durham